John Grenville is a historian.

John Grenville may also refer to:

 John Grenville, High Sheriff of Devon in 1395
John Granville, 1st Earl of Bath (1628–1701), born John Grenville
John Grenville (MP for Exeter), MP for Exeter
John Grenville (MP for Devon), MP for Devon (UK Parliament constituency)

See also

John Greville (disambiguation)